Moose Deer Point First Nation is a Potawatomi First Nation in the District Municipality of Muskoka, Ontario. It has a reserve called Moose Point 79. The reserve is located along Twelve Mile Bay.

The First nation is a member of the Anishinabek Nation organization.

Members of Moose Deer Point are descended from settlers from the American Midwest who arrived in Southern Ontario (Beausoleil Island on Georgian Bay) in the 1830s and later arrived in the area. The reserve was surveyed in 1917.

Government

The reserve is led by band council consisting of a Chief and four councillors. The council is supported by an administrator, finance officer and clerical staff.

Services
Basic services offered to reserve residents include:

 Children Services
 Elders Services
 Health Services
 Education
 Social Services
 Recreation
 Economic Development
 Water Services
 Fire Services – one station with man by volunteers in Gordons Bay; supported by two fire trucks
 Maintenance

More advanced medical services are available from Georgian Bay General Hospital in Penetanguishene, Ontario or Huntsville District Memorial Hospital in Huntsville, Ontario.

Transportation

Twelve Mile Bay Road is the main road in the reserve and makes connections to Ontario Highway 400.

Local roads on reserve:

 Williams Wharf Road
 Ogemawahj Road
 Mitawbik Road
 Moose Deer Point Marina Road
 Bloody Bay Road
 Harrison Trail
 Lagoon Road

Water access to the area are made by boats from Moose Deer Point Marina.

Communities

 King Bay – residential area located near Big David Bay
 Isaac Bay – residential area along Twelve Mile Bay
 Gordons Bay – main hub with commercial, recreational and administration services along Twelve Mile Bay

Nearby

 O'Donnell Point Provincial Nature Reserve – a non-operating provincial park (closed to public use)

References

External links
 Moose Deer Point First Nation

Potawatomi reserves in Ontario
Communities in the District Municipality of Muskoka